The 1924–25 Challenge Cup was the 25th staging of rugby league's oldest knockout competition, the Challenge Cup.

First round
The draw for the first round of the competition was made on 21 January 1925 and brought together the 27 teams of the rugby league joined by 5 junior clubs.  The junior clubs involved in the tournament were Barnsley United of Hull, Twelve Apostles of Leigh, Castleford (who were to join the league in 1926), Dalton from Dalton-in-Furness, Lancashire and Flimby and Fothergill from Cumberland.

Twelve Apostles were drawn at home but ceded home advantage to Leeds as this would generate greater gate receipts. Ties were to be played on Saturday 14 February but the game between Keighley and Dewsbury was postponed due to the pitch at Lawkholme Lane being waterlogged.  The tie was played on Wednesday 18 February

Wigan's victory against Flimby & Fothergill set records for the Wigan club that still stand in 2018, the score was the club's biggest victory and Jim Sullivan's kicking 22 goals and his points total of 44 set an individual record for a Wigan player.  Sullivan's 22 goals (out of 22 attempts) also remains a record for any player in the Challenge Cup.

Replays
Both drawn games were replayed on 18 February 2018.

The Halifax v Featherstone tie required a second replay which was played at a neutral venue, Headingley, Leeds, on Monday 23 February.  The tie had taken fours hours of play to resolve but no tries had been scored as all the points came from kicked goals.

Second round
The second round had been drawn on 16 February before three of the first round ties had been resolved, with the ties to be played on Saturday 28 February.

Third round
The third round was drawn on Monday 2 March with ties to be played on 14 March.

Semi-finals
The draw for the semi-finals was made on Monday 16 March 1925 and produced a Yorkshire derby and a Lancashire derby.  Both games were played at neutral venues on 4 April.

Final
The week after the semi-finals, the Rugby League Council announced that the final would be played at Headingley, Leeds on Saturday 25 April 1925.  The match referee was to be R. Jones with F. Fairhurst and W. K. Hirst as the touch judges.

Oldham's win was played before a crowd of 28,335, gate receipts totalled £2,878 10s 9d.

This was Oldham’s fifth appearance in the final, having been losing finalists the previous season and their second win, their previous victory being in 1899.  For Hull Kingston Rovers the match was a second appearance in the final, the previous occasion having been in 1905.

References

Challenge Cup
Challenge Cup